The legislative districts of Negros Oriental are the representations of the province of Negros Oriental in the various national legislatures of the Philippines. The province is currently represented in the lower house of the Congress of the Philippines through its first, second, and third congressional districts.

History 
Negros Oriental was divided into two congressional districts from 1907 to 1972, it was redistricted into three congressional districts in 1986. It was part of the representation of Region VII from 1978 to 1984, and from 1984 to 1986 it elected 3 assemblymen at-large. Siquijor was last represented as part of the province's second district in 1972.

1st District 

Cities: Canlaon, Guihulngan (became city 2007)
Municipalities: Ayungon, Bindoy, Jimalalud, La Libertad, Manjuyod, Tayasan, Vallehermoso
Population (2020): 445,970

1907–1972 
Municipalities: Amlan (Ayuquitan Nuevo), Bais (became city 1968), Dumaguete (became city 1948), Guihulngan, Tanjay, Tayasan, Manjuyod (re-established 1908), Jimalalud (re-established 1910), Sibulan (re-established 1910), Vallehermoso (re-established 1913), La Libertad (re-established 1918), Canlaon (established 1946, became city 1961), Bindoy (Payabon) (established 1949), Pamplona (established 1959), San Jose (established 1955), Mabinay (established 1959)

2nd District 

City: Bais, Dumaguete, Tanjay (became city 2001)
Municipalities: Amlan, Mabinay, Pamplona, San Jose, Sibulan
Population (2020): 535,632

1907–1972 
Municipalities: Bacong, Bayawan (Tolong Nuevo), Dauin, Larena, Lazi, Siaton, Siquijor, Valencia (Nueva Valencia, later Luzuriaga), Zamboanguita (established 1908), San Juan (re-established 1908), Maria (re-established 1909), Enrique Villanueva (Talingting) (established 1924), Santa Catalina (Tolong Viejo) (re-established 1947), Basay (established 1968)

Notes

3rd District 
City: Bayawan (became city 2000)
Municipalities: Bacong, Basay, Dauin, Santa Catalina, Siaton, Valencia, Zamboanguita
Population (2020): 451,388

At-Large (defunct)

Malolos Congress 

Notes

1943-1944 
Includes present-day Siquijor

1984-1986

See also 
Legislative district of Siquijor

References 

Negros Oriental
Politics of Negros Oriental